Lee Sung-gang (born October 25, 1962) is a South Korean film director and screenwriter. He is recognized for the lyricism in his animated films, the best known of which are My Beautiful Girl, Mari (2002) and Yobi, the Five Tailed Fox (2007).

Career
Lee Sung-gang graduated with a Psychology degree from Yonsei University in 1991. He started his career as an animator in 1995 by directing numerous animated short films such as Soul, Lovers, Umbrella, and Ashes in the Thicket. He debuted as a feature-length animation director with My Beautiful Girl, Mari in 2002. For his sophomore effort, he directed the live-action feature film Texture of Skin in 2005 (which received a theater release in 2007). He returned to animation in 2007, with Yobi, the Five Tailed Fox.

Lee was awarded the 26th Annecy International Animated Film Festival (Grand Prix, Best Feature Film) in 2002, Animafest Zagreb (Special Award) in 2004, and Chicago International Children's Film Festival (Certificate of Excellence Prize) in 2005.

Filmography
 Aksim (2014) (director)
 A Monster in the Reservoir (2012) (director, writer, cinematographer, editor, producer)
 The House (2010) (producer)
 A Day of Water Giant (2008) (director)
 Yobi, the Five Tailed Fox (2007) (director, writer)
 If You Were Me: Anima Vision "Bicycle Trip" (2005) (director, writer, editor)
 Texture of Skin (2005) (director, writer)
 O-nu-ri (2004) (director, writer)
 My Beautiful Girl, Mari (2002) (director, writer)
 Room of Sound  (2000)
 Record of April 23  (2000) (director, writer)
 Ashes in the Thicket (1999) (director, writer)
 Ocean (1998) (director, editor, sound)
 Umbrella (1997) (director, writer, sound)
 낫 (1997) (director)
 Thief  (1997) (director)
 Lovers (1996) (director, writer, sound)
 Soul (1995) (director, writer)
 Torso (1995) (director)
 Du Gaeui Bang (Room for Two) (1995) (director, writer)

References

External links
 
 
 

1962 births
Living people
South Korean screenwriters
South Korean film directors
South Korean animators
South Korean animated film directors
Yonsei University alumni